Unaula is a village in Jagat block, Budaun district, Uttar Pradesh, India. The village is administrated by Gram Panchayat. Budaun railway station is 9 KM away from the village. According to 2011 Census of India the total population of the village is 2738 where 1499 are males and 1239 are females.

References

Villages in Budaun district